Nkangala is one of the 3 districts of Mpumalanga province of South Africa. The seat of Nkangala is Middelburg. The Nkangala District Municipality consists of 160 towns and villages. The most spoken language of its 1,308,129 people is IsiNdebele with 28.4%, closely followed by Zulu speakers (2011 Census). The district code is DC31.

Geography

Neighbours 
Nkangala is surrounded by:
 Sekhukhune (CBDC3) to the north 
 Ehlanzeni (DC32) to the north-east 
 Gert Sibande (DC30) to the south 
 Sedibeng (DC42) to the south-west
 Ekurhuleni (EastRand) to the south-west
 City of Tshwane to the west 
 Waterberg (DC36) to the north-west

Local municipalities 
The district contains the following local municipalities:

Demographics
The following statistics are from the 2001 census.

Gender

Ethnic group

Age

Politics

Election results 
Election results for Nkangala in the South African general election, 2004. 
 Population 18 and over: 608 871 [59.66% of total population] 
 Total votes: 389 097 [38.12% of total population] 
 Voting % estimate: 63.90% votes as a % of population 18 and over

References

External links
 Nkangala DM official website

District municipalities of Mpumalanga
Nkangala District Municipality